The 1965 1. divisjon was the 22nd completed season of top division football in Norway.

Overview
It was contested by 10 teams, and Skeid won the championship, their first title. Both newcomers, Lisleby and Hødd, were relegated back to the 2. divisjon.

Teams and locations
''Note: Table lists in alphabetical order.

League table

Results

Season statistics

Top scorer
 Per Kristoffersen, Fredrikstad – 20 goals

Attendance

References
Norway - List of final tables (RSSSF)

Eliteserien seasons
Norway
Norway
1